Edward Boardman (1833–1910) was a Norwich born architect. He succeeded John Brown as the most successful Norwich architect in the second half of the 19th century. His work included both civic and
ecclesiastical buildings, in addition to private commissions. Together, with his rival, George Skipper, he produced many notable buildings with several standing to this day (2013).

Career
Boardman received his early education at the Baptist school in Norwich founded by the father of John Sherren Brewer. His school fellows included the headmaster's grandson Henry William Brewer, later a notable architectural illustrator, the clinician and physiologist Sydney Ringer and the orientalist Professor Robert Lubbock Bensly.

Boardman trained as an architect with the London-based company Lucas Brothers and was later articled with John Louth Clemence of Lowestoft. In 1860, he established his own practice in Norwich, before being accepted as a Fellow of the Royal Institute of British Architects (FRIBA) in 1871. From 1875, his offices were located at Old Bank of England Court, Queen Street, Norwich.

His major works in Norwich include the refurbishment of the Norfolk and Norwich Hospital, converting Norwich Castle into a museum, building the notable Royal Hotel and the mortuary chapel in the city's Rosary Cemetery. Outside of the city, he was responsible for the remodelling of Peckover House in Wisbech, the enlargement of Coltishall Primary School and in 1873, the building of the Dereham Congregational Church are among his most notable works.

Personal life
Boardman was born in Norwich in 1833 and lived at 91 Newmarket Road, Norwich to his death on 11 November 1910. He was elected Mayor of Norwich for 1905–1906. Boardman's son retired in 1933 and the practice continued until 1966. He is buried at the city's Rosary Cemetery.

Family
His son Edward Thomas (also an architect) was born in 1862 and joined the family firm in 1889. He assumed control of the business in 1900. 
The younger Edward married Florence, a daughter of Jeremiah Colman and Caroline Colman members of the Colman's family. They bought the How Hill estate at Ludham, Norfolk and built How Hill House as a holiday home in 1904. They extended the house in 1915 and moved there permanently. Among their children were Humphrey who represented Great Britain in the 1928 Summer Olympics in the double sculls and Christopher, who won a gold medal at the 1936 Summer Olympics in the 6 metre yachting competition. The younger Edward's sister in law Ethel Colman was the first female Lord Mayor of Norwich in 1923.

One of Boardman's daughters, Ethel Marion, married Percy Jewson, who was Lord Mayor of Norwich 1934-35 and National Liberal MP for Great Yarmouth 1941–45,

Gallery

Works
This list is incomplete

Norwich

Ecclesiastical
1868      St Mary's Baptist Church, Duke Street was destroyed in World War II.
1869      Congregational Church, Princes Street was redesigned by Boardman (of which he was a member).
1875      Unthank Road Baptist Church, demolished in 1955.
1879      The Gothic Mortuary Chapel in Rosary Cemetery.
1880      Chapelfield Methodist Church.
1882      St Edmund, Fishergate restoration.
1883      St Eltheldreda, restoration.

Public
1876–1880 London Street improvement scheme.
1879–1884 He rebuilt much of the city's Norfolk and Norwich Hospital.
1887      The conversion of Norwich Castle from a gaol to a museum.
1899      Extension to the Bethel Hospital.

Private
1869      He designed Grade II terraced housing and villas in Chester Place for Henry Trevor, owner of the Plantation Garden and Plantation house.
1870      12, Gentlemen's Walk. A branch of the Halifax Building Society occupy the building today (2013).
1874      Castle House, Castle Meadow Fletcher's printing works.
1877     Gothic style piano warehouse in Gentlemen's Walk. Later occupied by a branch of Burton's and today (2013) Jack Wills.
1877      Castle Chambers, Castle Meadow.
1879      Norvic Shoe Factory for Messrs Howlett and White, extension to hold machinery added in 1894. The building today (2013) is used for offices and dwellings.
1880      Venetian gothic style building in London Street. Today (2013) the building houses a Stead and Simpson outlet.
1888      The Norfolk Club coffee room.
1889      Caleys chocolate factory later Rowntree Mackintosh and finally Nestle was destroyed in 1942 by enemy bombing. The factory was rebuilt in 1955 and demolished in 1994 to make way for the Chapelfield shopping mall.
1890s     Alexandra Mansions, Prince of Wales Road.
1896–1897 The Royal Hotel, which he designed in a Flemish style completed in ornate brickwork and Cosseyware. Today (2013), the building is mainly used for offices.
1899      The former Eastern Daily Press office at 57, London Street.
1899      Office block at 5, Bank Plain. Today the building houses a branch of William H. Brown

Norfolk
Coltishall

Public

1875–1877 Enlargement of the primary school (extant ?).
 
Cromer

Public
1893  Fletcher Convalescent Home, (Derelict state). In 2008 The Victorian Society listed the building as one of its 'Top Ten Endangered Buildings'.

Private
1877–1878 Vernon House, 36 to 38 Church St. 2 shops with accommodation above.
1878–1879  Harbord House (formerly Carrington Villas), Overstrand Rd. Built for Lord Suffield of Gunton Hall, Norfolk.
1887 Cambridge House Hotel, Jetty Cliff
1887 Red Lion Hotel, Brook Street
1902–1903 Barclays Bank, Tucker street, Refurbishment and stone facade
Dereham

Ecclesiastical
1873 The congregational church.

Dunston

Private
1878 Dunston Hall, Mock Elizabethan grade II listed building. Now an AA [3] four star rated hotel, and part of the De Vere Group of hotels.

Sprowston

Ecclesiastical
1886–1890 Restoration of St Mary and St Margaret.

Stoke Holy Cross

Private
1890 Various alterations and improvements to Stoke Hall, including improvements to the drainage, adding extra water closets and more servants accommodation plus adding another chimney. Hall demolished in 1938.
Trowse

Private
1866  He designed the formal garden at Crown Point – Whitlingham Hall and completed the noted aisled conservatory.

Upper Sheringham

Private
1913–1914 The Dales, Grade II listed building, now used as a hotel.
Wymondham

Ecclesiastical
1871 The Methodist Church

Cambridgeshire
Wisbech

Private
1877–1878 Added the wings for the library and service area for Alexander Peckover as part of his remodelling of Peckover House.

References

External links
Photograph of Boardman
Boardman family photos

1833 births
1910 deaths
19th-century English architects
English Congregationalists
Architects from Norwich
Fellows of the Royal Institute of British Architects
Mayors of Norwich